David William Atkinson (born 1948) is a Canadian academic and former president of MacEwan University. He is the former president of Kwantlen Polytechnic University and two Ontario universities, Brock University in St. Catharines and Carleton University in Ottawa.

Atkinson was born in Sunderland, England, and immigrated to Canada when very young. Educated in Calgary, he attended Indiana University, where he was an All-American in cross country, and a member of the Big Ten Championship cross country team. He returned to the University of Calgary, where he completed his B.A. degree (1970), and subsequently earned an M.A. (1971), and a Ph.D. degree (1975) in English.
 
Atkinson was a faculty member at the University of Lethbridge from 1977 to 1991, where he took on increasingly senior administrative positions, including director of applied studies, chair of religious studies, associate dean of arts and science, and dean of student affairs. In 1991, he was appointed Dean of Arts and Science at the University of Saskatchewan. In 1997 he was appointed president of Brock University in St. Catharines, Ontario, and in 2005 president of Carleton University in Ottawa, Ontario, a position from which he resigned.
 
He was appointed president of Kwantlen University College in Surrey, British Columbia. He resigned to take up the post of president of MacEwan University on July 1, 2011.
 
Between 2011 and 2017 Atkinson was the fourth president of MacEwan University. During that time MacEwan centralized its satellite campuses to the city center and constructed a new Centre for Arts and Culture building. He also oversaw the official re-branding of Grant MacEwan University into MacEwan University. Atkinson will return to teach English at the university in 2018. His successor, Dr. Deborah Saucier, will enter office on July 1, 2017.
 
Atkinson is a Paul Harris Fellow of Rotary International. He has also received the Queen's Golden Jubilee Medal and Diamond Jubilee Medal. Atkinson has held faculty positions in both English and religious studies.  He has published widely in both disciplines.

See also 
 List of Canadian university leaders

References

External links 

 

Presidents of Carleton University
Canadian people of English descent
Living people
University of Calgary alumni
People from Sunderland
1948 births
MacEwan University people